Birmingham–Southern College (BSC) is a private college in Birmingham, Alabama. Founded in 1856, the college is affiliated with the United Methodist Church and is accredited by the Southern Association of Colleges and Schools (SACS). More than 1300 students from 33 states and 16 foreign countries attend the college.

History

Birmingham–Southern College is the result of a merger of Southern University, founded in Greensboro, Alabama, in 1856, with Birmingham College, opened in 1898 in Birmingham, Alabama.  These two institutions were consolidated on May 30, 1918, under the name of Birmingham–Southern College.  Phi Beta Kappa recognized Birmingham–Southern in 1937, establishing the Alabama Beta chapter.  Only ten percent of the nation's institutions of higher education shelter Phi Beta Kappa chapters, and Birmingham–Southern College is one of only three sheltering institutions in the state of Alabama.

Presidents

 1918–21: Cullen C. Daniel
 1921–37: Guy E. Snavely
 1938–42: Raymond R. Paty
 1942–55: George R. Stuart
 1955–57: Guy E. Snavely
 1957–62: Henry King Stanford
 1963–68: Howard M. Phillips
 1968–69: Robert F. Henry
 1969–72: Charles D. Hounshell
 1972–75: Ralph M. Tanner
 1976–2004: Neal R. Berte
 2004–10: G. David Pollick
 2011–15: Charles C. Krulak
 2015–2016: Edward F. Leonard III
 2016–2018: Linda Flaherty-Goldsmith
 2018–present: Daniel B. Coleman

Academics 
The college currently offers five bachelor's degrees in more than 50 programs of study, as well as interdisciplinary and individualized majors and dual degree programs.

Campus
The campus is situated on 192 wooded acres three miles west of downtown Birmingham.  The college has 45 academic, residential, administrative, and athletics buildings/facilities. Some highlights:

Elton B. Stephens Science Center: Housing the natural sciences, the 100,000-square-foot, $24.1 million Stephens Science Center.

Norton Campus Center: The hub of campus, the Norton Campus Center houses the bookstore, cafeteria, post office, and student lounge areas as well as offices for student development, residence life, and counseling and health services.

Munger Memorial Hall: The architectural centerpiece of campus, Munger Hall, built in the 1920s, houses administrative offices and a 900-seat auditorium.

Berte Humanities Center: Named in honor of former BSC President Neal Berte, the Humanities Center opened in 2004 and houses the foreign languages lab, the academic resource center (ARC), and classrooms designed for BSC's small student-to-faculty ratio.

College Theatre: With a split-revolve-lift stage, the main theatre can host a variety of set designs.

Lakeview Residence Halls: The first Leadership in Energy and Environmental Design (LEED) residence halls in Alabama, Lakeview North and South opened in 2010 and offer suite-style living for upperclass students.

Hilltop Village Apartments: Recently renovated, the Hilltop Village apartment complex contains sixteen buildings that house approximately 350 students.

Urban Environmental Park: The Urban Environmental Park features the 1.5 acre Bennett Lake (named after Class of 2009 Alum John Jennings Bennett, Esq.), The Gilmore Lawn, walking paths, and Wi-Fi internet. The entrance to the park is through the Voltz Flight of Stairs, which is named after Class of 2009 Alum Ingram Voltz.

N.E Miles Library: The N.E. Miles Library includes a collection of 257,000 volumes, 57,000 government documents, and more than 20,000 recordings, compact discs, and DVDs.  More than 135 online databases provide access to the full text of over 40,000 periodicals and numerous e-books. The library also features an auditorium, study areas, conference rooms, and an electronic classroom.

Striplin Fitness and Recreation Center: The main facility for campus recreation, Striplin features two basketball courts, an indoor jogging track, racquetball courts, a golf simulator, an indoor swimming pool, and strength training and cardiovascular workout rooms.

Student life

Greek life

Fraternities
 Kappa Alpha Order  1882
 Alpha Tau Omega 1885
 Theta Chi 1942 
 Sigma Chi 1991
 Alpha Phi Alpha
 Lambda Chi Alpha 1924 (closed 1983)
 Sigma Alpha Epsilon 1878

Sororities
 Zeta Tau Alpha 1922
 Alpha Omicron Pi 1925
 Alpha Chi Omega 1926
 Pi Beta Phi 1927–1989, recolonized 1991
 Gamma Phi Beta 1930–1957
 Kappa Delta 1930
 Delta Zeta 1963–1974
 Chi Omega 1989
 Alpha Kappa Alpha 1979–2006; 2021

Athletics

Birmingham–Southern athletic teams are the Panthers. The college is a member of the Division III level of the National Collegiate Athletic Association (NCAA), primarily competing in the Southern Athletic Association (SAA) since the 2012–13 academic year. The Panthers previously competed in the D-III Southern Collegiate Athletic Conference (SCAC) from 2007–08 to 2011–12; in the Big South Conference of the Division I ranks of the NCAA from 2001–02 to 2006–07; and in the TranSouth Athletic Conference (TranSouth or TSAC) of the National Association of Intercollegiate Athletics (NAIA) from 1996–97 to 2000–01.

Birmingham–Southern competes in 22 intercollegiate varsity sports: Men's sports include baseball, basketball, cross country, football, golf, lacrosse, soccer, swimming, tennis and track & field (indoor and outdoor); while women's sports include basketball, cross country, golf, lacrosse, soccer, softball, swimming, tennis, track & field and volleyball.

Overview
Birmingham–Southern enjoyed a successful run in the NAIA prior to joining the NCAA. After three years as a Division I member, the college moved to Division III in 2006. Panther Stadium, home to the college's football program, hosted its first home football game on November 8, 2008. The stadium features an athletic building that includes a press box, coaches' offices, meeting rooms, athletic training room, officials' dressing room, and locker rooms for football, lacrosse, track and field, and cross country.

Notable alumni
 William Acker –  United States district judge
 Robert Aderholt – United States congressman from Alabama (1997–present)
 Laurie C. Battle – United States congressman from Alabama (1947–1955)
 Amanda Bearse – actress, best known for her role as Marcy on the television sitcom Married... with Children.
 Richmond C. Beatty (BA 1926) – academic, biographer and critic
 Harvie Branscomb – Chancellor, Vanderbilt University (1946–1963)
 Lewis C. Branscomb (1865–1930) – Methodist minister
 Charles Brooks – Editorial cartoonist
 Pat Buttram – Actor (sidekick of Gene Autry in films, and Mr. Haney in the TV series Green Acres)
 Miles Copeland III – Music and entertainment executive, former manager of The Police and cofounder of I.R.S. Records
 Howard Cruse – Cartoonist
 Charles Gaines – Author, journalist, screenwriter, editor; Cine Gold Eagle Awards, National Academy of Television Arts and Sciences Emmy Award
 Alexander Gelman – Theatre Director, Organic Theater Company, Chicago
 Rebecca Gilman – American playwright
 Jennifer Hale – Voice Actress
 Walker Hayes  – Country Singer / Songwriter
 Donald Heflin – American diplomat
 Howell Heflin – U.S. Senator from Alabama (1978–1997)
 Perry O. Hooper, Sr. – 27th Chief Justice of the Alabama Supreme Court
 Alexa Jones – former Miss Alabama and news reporter
 Hugh Martin – Broadway and film composer and arranger, including movie musical Meet Me In St. Louis, starring Judy Garland.
 Walter P. McConaughy – Career diplomat and US Ambassador to Burma, South Korea, Pakistan, and Taiwan.
 John B. McLemore – (Dropout after 3 years) Antique clock restorer, and focus of "This American Life" podcast "S- Town"
 Morgan Murphy – Food critic and author
 Joe Nasco – Professional Footballer
 Sena Jeter Naslund – Author
 LaFayette L. Patterson – United States Representative
 Gin Phillips – Novelist
 Howell Raines – Executive editor, The New York Times (2001–2004); Pulitzer Prize for Feature Writing, 1992
 Ray Reach – Jazz pianist, vocalist, arranger, composer, producer and educator.  Director of Student Jazz Programs at the Alabama Jazz Hall of Fame.
 Glenn Shadix – American actor
 Daryl Shore – Professional soccer player and coach
 Morgan Smith Goodwin – Actress, Spokesperson for Wendy's 
 Luther Leonidas Terry – Surgeon General of the United States (1961–1965)
 Martin Waldron (1925–1981) – Winner of the 1964 Pulitzer Prize
 Ray Wedgeworth – Jacksonville State University head coach: basketball (1951–1953), football (1953), and baseball (1964–1970)
 Frederick Palmer Whiddon – President, University of South Alabama (1963–1998)
 Robert Lee Williams – 3rd Governor of Oklahoma  (1915–1919)
 John H. Yardley – Pathologist

References

Further reading
 Joseph H. Parks and Oliver C. Weaver, Birmingham-Southern College, 1856–1956. Nashville, TN: Parthenon Press, 1957.

External links

 
 Official athletics website

 
Buildings and structures completed in 1921
National Register of Historic Places in Birmingham, Alabama
Educational institutions established in 1856
Universities and colleges in Birmingham, Alabama
1856 establishments in Alabama
Universities and colleges formed by merger in the United States
Private universities and colleges in Alabama